The Priobskoye field is an oil field in Russia.

History
The field was discovered in 1982. The northern three-quarters of the field was controlled by YUKOS via its daughter-company Yuganskneftegaz, and began oil production in 2000. In 2004, Yuganskneftegaz was bought by Rosneft, which is now the operating company for that portion of the field.  The southern quarter of the field was controlled by Sibir energy, which began a joint venture with Sibneft to develop the field, with volume production beginning in 2003.  Sibneft subsequently acquired complete control of the field via a corporate maneuver to dilute Sibir's holding.  Sibneft is now majority controlled by Gazprom and renamed Gazprom Neft.

Production
In 2009, Gazprom Neft produced  in its share of the field. In September 2019, Russia’s finance ministry approved tax breaks for developing the Priobskoye oilfield, Russia’s largest, to oil giants Rosneft and Gazprom Neft, Alexei Sazanov.

See also

 Tunguska Basin
 West Siberian petroleum basin

References

Oil fields of Russia
Yukos
Rosneft oil and gas fields
Gazprom oil and gas fields